Tonelli is an Italian surname. Notable people with this name include the following:

 Alessandro Tonelli (born 1992), Italian cyclist
 Anna Tonelli (c.1763–1846), Italian portrait painter in the late 17th century and early 18th century.
 Annalena Tonelli (1943–2003), Italian lawyer and social activist
 Bobby Tonelli (born 1975), American actor
 Gilles Tonelli (born 1957), Monegasque politician
 Giuseppe Tonelli (1668–1732), Italian painter
 Guido Tonelli (born 1950), Italian physicist
 Ideler Tonelli (1924–2016), Argentine lawyer and politician
 John Tonelli (born 1957), Canadian ice hockey player
 Leonida Tonelli (1885–1946), Italian mathematician
 Lorenzo Tonelli (born 1990), Italian footballer
 Maria Valentina Tonelli (1939–2016), Italian writer
 Mario Tonelli (1916–2003), American gridiron football player and survivor of the Bataan Death March
 Mark Tonelli (born 1957), Australian swimmer
 Pablo Tonelli (born 1954), Argentine politician
 Simone Tonelli (born 1991), Italian footballer
 Virginia Tonelli (1903–1944), Italian partisan

See also

 Tonello
Alessandro Tonolli

Italian-language surnames

Patronymic surnames